Mia Roberts Perez (born 1981) is an American attorney who is 
a United States district judge of the United States District Court for the Eastern District of Pennsylvania. She previously served as a judge on the Philadelphia County Court of Common Pleas from 2016 to 2022.

Education 
Perez earned a Bachelor of Arts degree from Tufts University in 2003 and a Juris Doctor from the Temple University Beasley School of Law in 2006.

Career 
From 2006 to 2010, Perez worked as an assistant public defender for the Defender Association of Philadelphia. From 2010 to 2011, Perez was an associate at Friedman Schuman in Philadelphia. From 2011 to 2016, she operated her own law firm,  Perez Law LLC, in Philadelphia. Perez was elected to the Philadelphia County Court of Common Pleas in 2016.

Federal judicial service 

On July 12, 2022, President Joe Biden nominated Perez to serve as a United States district judge of the United States District Court for the Eastern District of Pennsylvania. President Biden nominated Perez to the seat vacated by Judge Timothy J. Savage, who assumed senior status on March 1, 2021. On September 7, 2022, a hearing on her nomination was held before the Senate Judiciary Committee. On September 28, 2022, her nomination was reported out of committee by a 13–9 vote. On December 7, 2022, the United States Senate confirmed her nomination by a 52–43 vote. She received her judicial commission on December 16, 2022.

See also 
 List of African-American federal judges
 List of African-American jurists
 List of Asian American jurists
 List of Hispanic/Latino American jurists

References

External links 

1981 births
Living people
21st-century American women lawyers
21st-century American lawyers
American women judges
Hispanic and Latino American judges
Hispanic and Latino American lawyers
Judges of the Pennsylvania Courts of Common Pleas
Judges of the United States District Court for the Eastern District of Pennsylvania
Lawyers from Philadelphia
Pennsylvania Democrats
Pennsylvania lawyers
Public defenders
Temple University Beasley School of Law alumni
Tufts University alumni
United States district court judges appointed by Joe Biden